The CMA CGM Patagonia class is a series of 5 container ships being built for CMA CGM. The ships are built by Jiangnan Shipyard in China. The ships have a maximum theoretical capacity of around 15,046 twenty-foot equivalent units (TEU).

List of ships

References 

Container ship classes